El evangelio de las maravillas ("The Gospel of the Marvels") is a 1998 Mexican drama film directed by Arturo Ripstein. It was screened in the Un Certain Regard section at the 1998 Cannes Film Festival.

Plot
"La Nueva Jerusalem" is a small community of believers led by Papá Basilio (Rabal) and Mamá Dorita (Jurado). They're waiting for the second coming of Christ, so they've abandoned the world, searching for a new spiritual life. Mamá Dorita sees in young Tomasa (Gurrola) the signals of the chosen one. The young girl will be the new leader in "La Nueva Jerusalem".

Cast
 Francisco Rabal as Papá Basilio
 Katy Jurado as Mamá Dorita
 Flor Eduarda Gurrola as Tomasa (as Edwarda Gurrola)
 Carolina Papaleo as Nélida
 Bruno Bichir as Gavilán
 Patricia Reyes Spíndola as Micaela
 Rafael Inclán
 Rodrigo Ostap as Fidel
 Angelina Peláez as Elodia
 Gina Morett as Rita
 Juan Carlos Colombo
 Rafael Velasco as Mateo
 Marta Aura
 Asunción Balaguer as woman in the congregation
 Teresa Mondragón
 Julieta Egurrola as Tomasa's mother

References

External links

1998 films
1998 drama films
Mexican drama films
1990s Spanish-language films
Films directed by Arturo Ripstein
Films scored by David Mansfield
1990s Mexican films